Stone tablets inscribed with the Tripiṭaka (and other Buddhist texts) stand upright in the grounds of the Kuthodaw Pagoda ( means 'royal merit') at the foot of Mandalay Hill in Mandalay, Myanmar (Burma). The work was commissioned by King Mindon as part of his transformation of Mandalay into a royal capital. It was completed in 1868. The text contains the Buddhist canon in the Burmese language.

There are 730 tablets and 1,460 pages. Each stone tablet has its own roof and precious gem on top in a small cave-like structure of Sinhalese relic casket type called  (stone inscription cave in Burmese), and they are arranged around a central golden pagoda.

UNESCO inscription

In 2013, UNESCO plaque indicating that the Maha Lawkamarazein or Kuthodaw Inscription Shrines at Kuthodaw Pagoda, which contain the world's largest book in the form of 729 marble slabs on which are inscribed the Tripitaka, were inscribed on to the Memory of the World Register.

Royal merit

When the British invaded southern Burma in the mid-19th century, Mindon Min was concerned that Buddhist dhamma (teachings) would also be detrimentally affected in the North where he reigned. As well as organizing the Fifth Buddhist council in 1871, he was responsible for the construction in Mandalay of the world's largest book, consisting of 729 large marble tablets with the Tipitaka Pali canon of Theravada Buddhism inscribed on them in gold. One more was added to record how it all came about, making it 730 stone inscriptions in total.

Work began on 14 October 1860 in a large shed near Mandalay Palace. Scribes carefully copied the text on marble for stonemasons. Each stone has 80 to 100 lines of inscription on each side in round Burmese script, chiseled out and originally filled in with gold ink. It took a scribe three days to copy both the obverse and the reverse sides, and a stonemason could finish up to 16 lines a day. All the stones were completed and opened to the public on 4 May 1868.

Assembly and contents
The stones are arranged in neat rows within three enclosures, 42 in the innermost, 168 in the middle and 519 in the outermost enclosure. The caves are numbered starting from the west going clockwise forming complete rings as follows:

Thirty years later in 1900, a print copy of the text came out in a set of 38 volumes in Royal Octavo size of about 400 pages each in Great Primer type. The publisher, Philip H. Ripley of Hanthawaddy Press, claimed that his books were "true copies of the Pitaka inscribed on stones by King Mindon". Ripley was a Burmese-born Briton brought up in the royal court of Mandalay by the king and went to school with the royal princes including Thibaw Min, the last king of Burma. At the age of 17 he fled to Rangoon when palace intrigues and a royal massacre broke out after the death of King Mindon, and he had the galley proofs checked against the stones.

Annexation, desecration and restoration

The British later invaded the North, the gems and other valuables were looted, and the buildings and images vandalised by the troops billeted in the temples and pagodas near the walled city and Mandalay Hill. When the troops withdrew from religious sites after a successful petition to Queen Victoria, restoration work began in earnest in 1892 organised by a committee formed by senior monks, members of the royal family and former officers of the king including Atumashi Sayadaw (Abbot of Atumashi Monastery), Kinwon Min Gyi U Kaung (chancellor), Hleithin Atwinwun (minister of the royal fleet), Yaunghwe Saopha Sir Saw Maung (a Shan prince), and Mobyè Sitkè (a general in the royal army). In the tradition of the time, when something needed repair, it was first offered to the relatives of those who had originally made the Dāna (donation) and they came forward and assisted in making repairs. The public was then asked for help, but the full original glory was not achieved.

Mobyè Sitkè also asked permission from senior monks to plant star flower trees (Mimusops elengi) between the rows of s. The inscriptions have been re-inked several times since King Thibaw had it done for the second time in gold. The undergrowth amongst the caves was cleared and paved through public donations appealed for in the Ludu Daily in 1968. The words of the Buddha are still preserved there, therefore making it a popular destination for devout Buddhists as well as scholars and tourists.

See also
Pāli Canon
Fifth Buddhist council
Kuthodaw Pagoda
Pitakataik (Mandalay)

References

External links

Buddhist Wonders of the World
Kadve Pravachan – World's Largest & Heaviest Book 2013 World Record
World's largest Book Kadve Pravachan

1860s books
Buddhist pilgrimage sites in Myanmar
Buddhist temples in Myanmar
Burmese culture
Memory of the World Register
Burmese Buddhist texts
Buddhist inscriptions
Tripiṭaka